EJL may refer to:

Estonian Cyclists' Union
Estonian Football Association
Estonian Ice Hockey Association
Estonian Judo Association
Estonian Yachting Union